
Year 1577 (MDLXXVII) was a common year starting on Tuesday (link will display the full calendar) of the Julian calendar.

Events 
 January–June 
 January 9 – The second Union of Brussels is formed, first without the Protestant counties of Holland and Zeeland (which is accepted by King Philip II of Spain), later with the Protestants, which means open rebellion of the whole of the Netherlands.
 March 17 – The Cathay Company is formed, to send Martin Frobisher back to the New World for more gold.
 May 28 – The Bergen Book, better known as the Solid Declaration of the Formula of Concord, one of the Lutheran confessional writings, is published. The earlier version, known as the Torgau Book (1576), had been condensed into an Epitome; both documents are part of the 1580 Book of Concord.

 July–December 
 July 9 – Ludvig Munk is appointed Governor-General of Norway.
 September 17 – The Treaty of Bergerac is signed between Henry III of France and the Huguenots.
 November – The Great Comet of 1577 is observed from Earth.
 November 13 – The Battle of Tedorigawa: Uesugi Kenshin's forces decisively defeat the forces of Oda Nobunaga; this will be Kenshin's last victory before his death the following year.
 November 19 – The Siege of Shigisan: with defeat coming close Matsunaga Hisahide commits suicide.
 December 13 – Francis Drake leaves Plymouth, England, aboard the Pelican, with four other ships and 164 men, on an expedition against the Spanish, along the Pacific coast of the Americas, which will become his circumnavigation.

 Date unknown 
 Supposed massacre of the MacDonald inhabitants of the Scottish island of Eigg, by the Clan MacLeod.
 Mehmed Paša Sokolović Bridge over the Drina in Višegrad is completed in the Ottoman Empire.
 The church in San Pedro de Atacama is built, in the Atacama Desert in Chile.
 Casiodoro de Reina publishes his "Declaracion, o confesion de fe", the first and only Spanish confession of faith in the post Reformation period.

Births 

 January 9 – Anthony Irby, English politician (d. 1610)
 January 12 – Francesco Stelluti, Italian mathematician (d. 1652)
 January 13 – Hugh Audley, English moneylender/lawyer/philosopher (d. 1662)
 February 5 – Johann Baptist Grossschedel, German noble, alchemist and esoteric author (d. 1630)
 February 6 – Beatrice Cenci, Italian noblewoman who conspired to kill her father (d. 1599)
 February 7 – Francis Walsingham, English Jesuit (d. 1647)
 February 8 – Robert Burton, English scholar at Oxford University (d. 1640)
 February 15 – Jean Riolan the Younger, French anatomist (d. 1657)
 February 17 – Augustus, Duke of Saxe-Lauenburg, German noble (d. 1656)
 February 18 – Roger North, English politician (d. 1651)
 February 22 – Pieter Huyssens, Flemish architect (d. 1637)
 March 1 – Richard Weston, 1st Earl of Portland (d. 1635)
 March 2 – George Sandys, English traveller (d. 1644)
 March 5 – Franciscus Dousa, Dutch classical scholar (d. 1630)
 March 20 – Alessandro Tiarini, Italian Baroque painter of the Bolognese School (d. 1668)
 March 24 – Francis, Duke of Pomerania-Stettin, Bishop of Cammin (d. 1620)
 April 12 – King Christian IV of Denmark and Norway (d. 1648)
 April 26 – Countess Elisabeth of Nassau, French noble (d. 1642)
 May 20 – Philip de' Medici, Italian noble (d. 1582)
 May 31 – Nur Jahan, empress consort of the Mughal Empire (d. 1645)
 June 12 – Paul Guldin, Swiss Jesuit mathematician (d. 1643)
 June 28 – Peter Paul Rubens, Flemish painter (d. 1640)
 July 9 – Thomas West, 3rd Baron De La Warr, English governor of Virginia (d. 1618)
 July 21
 Anne de Montafié, Countess of Clermont-en-Beauvaisis, French countess (d. 1644)
 Adam Willaerts, Dutch painter (d. 1664)
 August 11 (bapt.) – Barnaby Potter, English Bishop of Carlisle (d. 1642)
 September 1 – Scipione Borghese, Italian Catholic cardinal and art collector (d. 1633)
 September 8 – Otto Heurnius, Dutch physician and philosopher (d. 1652)
 September 24 – Louis V, Landgrave of Hesse-Darmstadt from 1596 to 1626 (d. 1626)
 October 3 – Tobie Matthew, English Member of Parliament, later Catholic priest (d. 1655)
 October 6 – Ferdinand of Bavaria (d. 1650)
 October 11 – Jørgen Lunge, Danish politician (d. 1619)
 October 17
 Cristofano Allori, Italian portrait painter (d. 1621)
 Dmitry Pozharsky, Russian prince (d. 1642)
 November 2 – John Bridgeman, British bishop (d. 1652)
 November 4 – François Leclerc du Tremblay (d. 1638)
 November 10 – Jacob Cats, Dutch poet, jurist and politician (d. 1660)
 November 24 – Louis Philip, Count Palatine of Guttenberg, Palatinate-Veldenz (d. 1601)
 November 25 – Piet Pieterszoon Hein, Dutch admiral and privateer for the Dutch Republic (d. 1629)
 December 8 – Mario Minniti, Italian artist active in Sicily after 1606 (d. 1640)
 December 20 – Antonio Brunelli, Italian composer and theorist (d. 1630)
 December 25 – Petrus Kirstenius, German physician and orientalist (d. 1640)
 December 27 – William Howard, 3rd Baron Howard of Effingham, English politician and Baron (d. 1615)
 date unknown
 Christoph Besold, German jurist (d. 1638)
 Giacomo Cavedone, Italian painter (d. 1660)
 Robert Cushman, English Plymouth Colony settler (d. 1625)
 Kobayakawa Hideaki, Japanese samurai and warlord (d. 1602)
 William Noy, English lawyer and politician (d. 1634)
 Samuel Purchas, English travel writer (d. 1626)
 Meletius Smotrytsky, Ruthenian religious activist and author, who developed Church Slavonic grammar (d. 1633)
 Gerhard Johann Vossius, German classical scholar and theologian (d. 1649)

Deaths 

 January 23 – Nicolas, Duke of Mercœur, Roman Catholic bishop (b. 1524)
 February – Adam von Bodenstein, Swiss alchemist and physician (b. 1528)
 February 26 – King Eric XIV of Sweden (b. 1533)
 March 23 – Charles II, Margrave of Baden-Durlach (b. 1529)
 April 13 – Konrad Hubert, German theologian and hymnwriter (b. 1507)
 May – Richard Aertsz, Dutch painter (b. 1482)
 May 5 – Viglius, Dutch statesman (b. 1507)
 May 31 – García Álvarez de Toledo, 4th Marquis of Villafranca, Spanish noble and admiral (b. 1514)
 June 4 – Alvise I Mocenigo, Doge of Venice (b. 1507)
 June 7 – Daniel, Count of Waldeck (b. 1530)
 June 12 – Orazio Samacchini, Italian painter (b. 1532)
 July 23 – Scipione Rebiba, Italian cardinal (b. 1504)
 July 26 – Blaise de Lasseran-Massencôme, seigneur de Montluc, Marshal of France (b. 1502)
 August 12 – Thomas Smith, English scholar and diplomat (b. 1513)
 September 7 – Infanta Maria of Guimarães (b. 1538)
 September 27 – Diego de Covarubias y Leyva, Spanish jurist and archbishop of Cuenca (b. 1512)
 October 3 – Henry IX, Count of Waldeck (b. 1531)
 October 7 – George Gascoigne, English poet (b. c. 1525)
 October 10 – Maria of Portugal, Duchess of Viseu (b. 1521)
 November 19 – Matsunaga Hisahide, Japanese warlord (b. 1508)
 November 29 – Cuthbert Mayne, English saint (b. 1543)
 December 4 – Achilles Gasser, German physician and astrologer (b. 1505)
 December 18 – Anna of Saxony, princess consort of Orange (b. 1544)

References